Benjamin T. Russell (born 10 January 1983 in Halifax, West Yorkshire) is a rugby union player who plays at No. 8 or Flanker for London Welsh. He previously played for Saracens and Racing Metro. He has also played internationally for the England Sevens.

External links 
 
 
 

1983 births
Living people
Commonwealth Games medallists in rugby sevens
Commonwealth Games rugby sevens players of England
Commonwealth Games silver medallists for England
England international rugby sevens players
English rugby union players
Male rugby sevens players
Rugby sevens players at the 2006 Commonwealth Games
Rugby union flankers
Rugby union number eights
Rugby union players from Halifax, West Yorkshire
Saracens F.C. players
Medallists at the 2006 Commonwealth Games